Isluga River is a river in Chile and Bolivia, and is also known as Sitani or Arabilla. It starts at the confluence of the rivers Chaguane and Huinchuta and flows for  before reaching the Laguna Mucalliri of the Salar de Coipasa. It receives water from the volcanoes Isluga, Cabaray and Quimsachata as well as the Sierra Uscana.

There are a number of towns and hamlets in the catchment, as well as wetlands with a number of animal and plant species.

Course 

In its upper parts the Isluga River is also known as the Arabilla River.

After the confluence, the Isluga River proceeds in southeast-eastward direction save for a brief turn northeast, past the towns of Chaguane and Arabilla; between the two the Quebrada Taipicollo joins from the northwest. After Arabilla it turns more eastward and receives waters from the Laguna Arabilla farther south; the Isluga River here passes through wetland territory. It flows past the towns of Chapicollo, Enquelca and Coraguane before turning sharply to the south. After this turn the river continues first southeast-east, then due east between Cachaguano and Isluga where it has a slight northeasterly tilt, and finally southeastward towards Sitani and Cotasaya. The penultimate part of the river runs irregularly eastward towards Colchani and Pisigua. After a total course of  before ending into the Laguna Mucalliri, which is part of a system of wetlands at Salar de Coipasa. The Cariquima River ends into the same general area and is sometimes considered to be part of the Rio Isluga. From that area, the Sitani River continues into the Salar de Coipasa proper.

The Isluga River is entrenched between river terraces. It receives several tributaries that drain the Quimsachata, Isluga and Cabaray from the north; the Alsare from Cabaray is a major tributary.

Watershed 

The Isluga River drains  of Chile's Tarapaca Region and a further  of Bolivia, and lies at an average elevation of  elevation. The catchment of Isluga is more gentle than Pacific-draining catchments, resulting in the formation of wetlands.

The region has an arid climate. Most precipitation arrives from the Amazon and falls mainly during the summer months. This results in the region having a steppe vegetation above  elevation with about  precipitation. During the Quaternary, the Altiplano was at times wetter than today, resulting in the formation of lakes.

Much of the watershed is dominated by Oligocene to Quaternary age volcanic rocks formed by basalt, basaltic andesite, andesite and dacite.

A number of endorheic systems such as the Lauca River and the Isluga River drain the Altiplano. Part of the Isluga catchment was covered by lakes, which have left wetlands and small lakes.

Discharge 

Water temperatures at Ríos Arabilla at  elevation range . The salinity is dominated by chloride, sodium and sulfate owing to high evaporation and the dissolution of salts in the catchment. The waters are eutrophic.

A stream gauge was active at Bocatoma (between the towns of Isluga and Sitani) between 1995 and 2001, and at Puente in 1998.

Biology 

Plankton is dominated on the floral side by bacillariophyceae such as Navicula and Synedra while the faunal side is characterized by cladocerans (Alona and Bosmina), copepods (Boeckella), ostracods in shallower parts and rotifers.

Coleoptera of the genus Australelmis and chironomid flies further populate the waters. The fish Orestias agassii and Trichomycterus pencil catfishes  such as Trichomycterus rivulatus live in its waters. These fish are all vulnerable or at the risk of extinction. The Peru water frog has also been found, as are several mollusc species of the taxa chilinidae and veneroida and snails of the genus Heleobia.

A number of different plant species grow in the waters of the Isluga River, such as Carex, Catabrosa verdermanni, Deschampsia caespitosa, Deyeuxia curvula, Drabella, Distichia muscoides, Distichlis humilis, Eleocharis, Festuca nardifolia, Juncus, Lilaeopsis lineata, Oxychloe andina, Potamogeton strictum, Ranunculus, Sarcocornia pulvinata, Scirpus atacamensis and Triglochin palustris. The wetlands along the river are an important environment in the Altiplano.

The steppes surrounding the catchment feature a flora which includes quenoa and yareta; depending on the availability of water different places are dominated by different plants. Among the fauna are flamingos and vicuñas, lizards of the genus Liolaemus, the frog Pleurodema marmoratum and the toad Rhinella spinulosa. The amphibian and reptile faunas are little known, unlike the bird fauna.

Human activity 

The towns of Colchane, Isluga and Pisiga lie in the watershed, which is part of the commune of Colchane. There are further hamlets and villages in the catchment of the Isluga River. Most of the watershed is undeveloped, with agriculture being the main form of land use.

Wetlands in the catchment were important for pastoralism, which along with tourism of the Volcán Isluga National Park is an important economic resource for the area. Irrigation takes place in the watershed, but there is little information on it. An old plan of a transbasin diversion envisaged transferring water from the headwaters of the Isluga River to the Quebrada de Camiña by way of a tunnel to increase the water supply to the Camiña valley. Concerns have been raised in 2011 in Bolivia about diversions of the Isluga River.

History 

During the 16th century the Isluga region was part of the Caranga confederation, which extended to Lake Poopo. The Spanish Crown at that time was pursuing a plan to concentrate the native population in towns; in 1578 the border between the Corregimiento de Arica and Corregimiento de Caranga was drawn across the watershed and coincides with the present-day Chile-Bolivia border.

References

Sources 

 
 
 
 
 

Rivers of Antofagasta Region
Rivers of Oruro Department
Rivers of Chile
Rivers of Tarapacá Region
Rivers of Bolivia